Émile Edmond Saisset (16 September 181427 December 1863) was a French philosopher.

Life
Émile Edmond Saisset was born at Montpellier. He studied philosophy at the École Normale Supérieure, and carried on the eclectic tradition of his master along with Ravaisson and Jules Simon. In 1842 he was professor of philosophy at Caen, at the École Normale in Paris. He later moved on to the College de France in 1843. He  became a member  of the Academie des Sciences Morales et Politiques at the Sorbonne in 1862. Saisset, known as "fashionable psychologist", was associated with the Eclectic school of Victor Cousin.

Saisset's chief works are a monograph on Aenesidemus the Sceptic (1840); Le Scepticisme: Ænésidème, Pascal, Kant (1845); a translation of Spinoza (1843); Précurseurs et disciples de Descartes (1862); Discours de la philosophie de Leibniz (1857) (a work which had great influence on the progress of thought in France); Essai de philosophie religieuse (1859); Critique et histoire de la philosophie (1865).

His untimely death in 1863, "a year after his appointment to the Sorbonne, surely prevented his literary output from being more formidable."

References

1814 births
1863 deaths
French philosophers
Academic staff of the University of Paris
École Normale Supérieure alumni
French male non-fiction writers
Translators of Baruch Spinoza